Jorge Rafael Videla (2 August 1925 – 17 May 2013) was an Argentine military officer and dictator, Commander in Chief of the Army, member of the Military Junta, and de facto President of Argentina from 29 March 1976 to 29 March 1981. His reign, which was during the time of Operation Condor, was among the most infamous in Latin America during the Cold War, due to its high level of human rights abuses and severe economic mismanagement. 

He came to power in a coup d'état that deposed Isabel Perón. In 1985, two years after the return of a representative democratic government, he was prosecuted in the Trial of the Juntas for large-scale human rights abuses and crimes against humanity that took place under his rule, including kidnappings or forced disappearance, widespread torture and extrajudicial murder of activists and political opponents as well as their families at secret concentration camps. An estimated 13,000 to 30,000 political dissidents vanished during this period. Videla was also convicted of the theft of many babies born during the captivity of their mothers at the illegal detention centres and passing them on for illegal adoption by associates of the regime. In his defence, Videla maintained the female guerrilla detainees allowed themselves to become pregnant in the belief they would not be tortured or executed. On  2010, Videla took full responsibility for his army's actions during his rule. "I accept the responsibility as the highest military authority during the internal war. My subordinates followed my orders," he told an Argentine court. Videla also sheltered many Nazi fugitives as did Juan Perón before him, as Alfredo Stroessner did in Paraguay and as Hugo Banzer did in Bolivia; he was sometimes known as the "Hitler of the Pampa". He was under house arrest until  2008, when he was sent to a military prison.

Following a new trial, on  2010, Videla was sentenced to life in a civilian prison for the deaths of 31 prisoners following his coup. On 5 July 2012, Videla was sentenced to 50 years in civilian prison for the systematic kidnapping of children during his tenure. The following year, Videla died in the Marcos Paz civilian prison five days after suffering a fall in a shower.

Early life and family
Jorge Rafael Videla was born on 2 August 1925 in the city of Mercedes. He was the third of five sons born to Colonel Rafael Eugenio Videla Bengolea (1888–1951) and María Olga Redondo Ojea (1897–1987) and was christened in honor of his two older twin brothers, who had died of measles in 1923. Videla's family was a prominent one in San Luis Province, and many of his ancestors had held high public offices. His grandfather Jacinto had been governor of San Luis between 1891 and 1893, and his great-great-grandfather Blas Videla had fought in the Spanish American wars of independence and had later been a leader of the Unitarian Party in San Luis.

On 7 April 1948, Jorge Videla married Alicia Raquel Hartridge (28 September 1927 – 5 November 2021) daughter of Samuel Alejandro Hartridge Parkes (1891–1969), an English Argentine professor of physics and Argentine ambassador to Turkey, and María Isabel Lacoste Álvarez (1893–1939). They had seven children: María Cristina (1949), Jorge Horacio (1950), Alejandro Eugenio (1951–1971), María Isabel (1954), Pedro Ignacio (1956), Fernando Gabriel (1961) and Rafael Patricio (1963). Two of these, Rafael Patricio and Fernando Gabriel, joined the Argentine Army.

Army career
Videla joined the National Military College (Colegio Militar de la Nación) on  1942 and graduated on  1944 with the rank of second lieutenant. After steady promotion as a junior officer in the infantry, he attended the War College between 1952 and 1954 and graduated as a qualified staff officer. Videla served at the Ministry of Defence from 1958 to 1960 and thereafter he directed the Military Academy until 1962. In 1971, he was promoted to brigade general and appointed by Alejandro Agustin Lanusse as Director of the National Military College. In late 1973 the head of the Army, Leandro Anaya, appointed Videla as the Chief of Staff of the Army. In , the President, Isabel Perón, appointed Videla to the Army's senior position, the General Commander of the Army.

Coup d'état

Upon the death of President Juan Perón, his widow and Vice President Isabel became President. Videla headed a military coup which deposed her on  1976, during increasing violence, social unrest and economic problems. A military junta was formed, made up of him, representing the Army; Admiral Emilio Massera representing the Navy; and Brigadier General Orlando Ramón Agosti representing the Air Force.

Presidency
Two days after the coup, Videla formally assumed the post of President of Argentina.

Human rights violations

The military junta is remembered for the forced disappearances of large numbers of students. The Baltimore Sun reported at the beginning of 1976 that, 
In the jungle-covered mountains of Tucuman, long known as 'Argentina's garden', Argentines are fighting Argentines in a Vietnam-style civil war. So far, the outcome is in doubt. But there is no doubt about the seriousness of the combat, which involves 2,000 or so leftist guerrillas and perhaps as many as 10,000 soldiers. In late 1974 the ERP set up a rural front in Tucumán province and the Argentine Army deployed the 5th Mountain Brigade of the 2nd Army Division in counterinsurgency operations in the province. In early 1976 the mountain brigade was reinforced in the form of the 4th Airborne Brigade that had until then been withheld guarding strategic points in the city of Córdoba against ERP guerrillas and militants.

The members of the junta took advantage of the guerrilla threat to authorize the coup and naming the period in government as the "National Reorganization Process". In all, 293 servicemen and policemen were killed in left-wing terrorist incidents in 1975 and 1976. Videla narrowly escaped three assassination attempts by the Montoneros and ERP between February 1976 and April 1977.

Justice Minister Ricardo Gil Lavedra, who formed part of the 1985 tribunal judging the military crimes committed during the Dirty War, later declared, "I sincerely believe that the majority of the victims of the illegal repression were guerrilla militants". Some 10,000 of the disappeared were guerrillas of the Montoneros, and the People's Revolutionary Army. However, the campaign of repression actually intensified after the guerrillas were defeated and it was during this time, when they targeted the church, labor unions, artists, intellectuals and university students and professors, that the junta accumulated the greatest number of victims.

According to human right groups, an estimated 15,000 to 30,000 Argentines "disappeared" while in the custody of the police or the military. Among the victims were two French nuns (Alice Domon and Léonie Duquet) who had taught and cared for Videla's disabled son, Alejandro. Some 1,500 to 4,000 were drugged into a stupor, loaded into military aircraft, stripped naked and then thrown into the Rio de la Plata and Atlantic Ocean to drown in what became known as "death flights." Between 10,000 and 12,000 of the "disappeared," PEN (Poder Ejecutivo Nacional) detainees held in clandestine detention camps throughout the dictatorship, were eventually released under diplomatic pressure. Terence Roehrig estimates that of the disappeared "at least 10,000 were involved in various ways with the guerrillas".

In the book Disposición Final by Argentine journalist Ceferino Reato, Videla confirms for the first time that between 1976 and 1983, 8.000 Argentines have been murdered by his regime. The bodies were hidden or destroyed to prevent protests at home and abroad. Videla also maintained that female guerrilla detainees allowed themselves to become pregnant in the belief they would not be tortured or executed, but they were. The children whom they bore in prison were taken from them, illegally adopted by military families of the regime, and their identities were hidden for decades.

According to Human rights organisations in Argentina, between 1,900 and 3,000 Jews were among the 30,000 who were targeted by the Argentine military junta. It is a disproportionate number, as Jews comprised between 5–12% of those targeted but only 1% of the population. Historian Daniel Muchnik attributed this to many Jews gravitating to political activism and armed resistance groups such as the ERP and FAP during the period. However, testimonies from Jewish Argentines suggest that they were targeted for being Jewish. Many torture victims were said to have seen pictures of Adolf Hitler and swastikas on walls of torture chambers and interrogators uttering anti-Semitic epithets. Jews were also known to have suffered anti-Semitic harassment while in the Argentine military. Between 200 and 300 Jews were subject to attacks, often by their superiors.

Some 11,000 Argentines have applied for and received up to US$200,000 as monetary compensation from the state for the loss of loved ones during the military dictatorship. The Asamblea por los Derechos Humanos (APDH or Assembly for Human Rights) believes that 12,261 people were killed or disappeared during the "National Reorganization Process". Politically, all legislative power was concentrated in the hands of Videla's nine-man junta, and every important position in the national government was filled with loyal military officers.

Economic policy

As Argentina’s new president, Videla faced a collapsing economy racked by soaring inflation. He largely left economic policies in the hands of Minister José Alfredo Martínez de Hoz, who adopted a free trade and deregulatory economic policy.

Martínez de Hoz took measures to restore economic growth, reversing Peronism in favour of a free market economy. Inflation rate decreased somewhat, but remained still high.

He enjoyed the personal friendship of David Rockefeller, who facilitated Chase Manhattan Bank and International Monetary Fund loans of nearly US$1 billion after his arrival.

He eliminated all price controls and the exchange controls regime. The black market and shortages disappeared.

He freed exports (removed existing prohibitions and quotas and export taxes were repealed) and imports (removed existing prohibitions, quotas, and licenses and gradually reduced import tariffs).

During his tenure, the foreign debt increased fourfold, and disparities between the upper and lower classes became much more pronounced. The period ended in a tenfold devaluation and one of the worst financial crises in Argentine history.

Foreign relations

The coup d'état had been planned since October 1975, and the United States Department of State learned of the preparations two months before its execution. Henry Kissinger would meet several times with Argentine Armed Forces leaders after the coup, urging them to destroy their opponents quickly before outcry over human rights abuses grew in the United States.

The US State Department saw Argentina as a bulwark of anti-communism in South America and in early April 1976, the US Congress approved a request by the Ford Administration, written by Henry Kissinger, to grant $50,000,000 in security assistance to the junta. In 1977, the US Department of Defense authorized $700,000 to train 217 argentine military officers and in 1977 and 1978 the United States sold more than $120,000,000 in spare military parts to Argentina.

At the same time, though, the new US President Jimmy Carter highlighted issues of human rights and, in 1978, convinced Congress to cut off all US arms transfers to Argentina.

During Videla's regime, Argentina rejected the binding Report and decision of the Court of Arbitration over the Beagle conflict (about possession of the Picton, Lennox and Nueva islands)  at the southern tip of South America and started Operation Soberanía in order to invade the islands. In 1978, however, Pope John Paul II opened a mediation process. His representative, Antonio Samorè, successfully prevented full-scale war.

The conflict was not completely resolved until after Videla's time as president. Once the democratic rule was restored in 1983, the Treaty of Peace and Friendship of 1984 between Chile and Argentina (Tratado de Paz y Amistad), which acknowledged Chilean sovereignty over the islands, was signed and ratified by popular referendum.

Although Videla was anti-Communist, his regime maintained good relations with the Soviet Union and China; trade ties with both were expanded under his rule.

Public relations
One of Videla's greatest challenges was his image abroad. He attributed criticism over human rights to an anti-Argentine campaign. On 19 May 1976, he attended a luncheon with a group of Argentine intellectuals, including Ernesto Sábato, Jorge Luis Borges, Horacio Esteban Ratti (president of the Argentine Writers Society) and Father Leonardo Castellani. The latter expressed to Videla his concern regarding the disappearance of another writer, Haroldo Conti.

On 30 April 1977, Azucena Villaflor, along with 13 other women, started demonstrations on the Plaza de Mayo, in front of the Casa Rosada presidential palace, demanding to be told the whereabouts of their disappeared children. They became known as the Mothers of the Plaza de Mayo (Madres de Plaza de Mayo).

In response, the junta hired the Burson-Marsteller ad agency to formulate a pithy comeback: Los argentinos somos derechos y humanos (Literally, "We the Argentines are righteous and humane"). The slogan was printed on 250,000 bumper stickers and distributed to motorists throughout Buenos Aires to create the appearance of a spontaneous support of pro-junta sentiment, at a cost of approximately $16,117.

Videla used the 1978 FIFA World Cup for political purposes. He cited the enthusiasm of the Argentine fans for their victorious football team as evidence of his personal and the junta's popularity.

In 1980, Adolfo Pérez Esquivel, leader of the Peace and Justice Service, was awarded the Nobel Peace Prize for reporting many of Argentina's human rights violations to the world at large.

Later life and death
Videla relinquished power to Roberto Viola on  1981. On April 7th, 1982, Videla attended the swearing-in ceremony of general Mario Benjamín Menéndez as governor of the Malvinas Islands. The military regime continued until it collapsed after losing the Falklands war in 1982. Democracy was restored in 1983.

The new government began prosecution of top-ranking officers for crimes committed during the dictatorship in what was called the Trial of the Juntas of 1985. Videla was convicted of numerous homicides, kidnapping, torture, and many other crimes. He was sentenced to life imprisonment and was discharged from the military in 1985.

Videla was imprisoned for five years. In 1990, President Carlos Menem pardoned Videla and many other imprisoned former members of the military regime. Menem also pardoned the leftist guerrilla commanders accused of terrorism. In a televised address to the nation, President Menem said,  "I have signed the decrees so we may begin to rebuild the country in peace, in liberty and in justice ... We come from long and cruel confrontations. There was a wound to heal."

Videla briefly returned to prison in 1998 when a judge found him guilty of the kidnapping of babies during the Dirty War, including the child of the desaparecida Silvia Quintela, and the disappearances of the commanders of the People's Revolutionary Army (ERP), Mario Roberto Santucho and Benito Urteaga. Videla spent 38 days in the old part of the Caseros Prison. Due to health issues, he was later transferred to house arrest.

Following the election of President Néstor Kirchner in 2003, there was a renewed widespread effort in Argentina to show the illegality of Videla's rule. The government no longer recognized Videla as having been a legal president of the country, and his portrait was removed from the military school. In 2003, Congress repealed the Ley de Punto Final, which had ended prosecutions for crimes under the dictatorship. In 2005, the Argentine Supreme Court ruled that the law had been unconstitutional. The government re-opened prosecution of crimes against humanity.

On 6 September 2006, Judge Norberto Oyarbide ruled that the pardons granted by President Menem were unconstitutional. On  2007, a federal court struck down Videla's presidential pardon and restored his convictions for human rights abuses.

He was put on trial on  2010 for new charges of human rights violations relating to the deaths of 31 prisoners who died under his rule. Three days later, Videla took full responsibility for his army's actions during his rule, saying, "I accept the responsibility as the highest military authority during the internal war. My subordinates followed my orders." On  2010, the trial ended, and Videla was convicted and sentenced to life in prison. He was ordered to be transferred to a civilian prison immediately after the trial. In handing down the sentence, judge María Elba Martínez said that Videla was "a manifestation of state terrorism." During the trial, Videla had said that "yesterday's enemies are in power and from there, they are trying to establish a Marxist regime" in Argentina.

On 5 July 2012, Videla was convicted and sentenced to 50 years' imprisonment for his participation in a scheme to steal babies from parents detained by the military regime. According to the court decision, Videla was an accomplice "in the crimes of theft, retention and hiding of minors, as well as replacing their identities." The children were given to military families for illegal adoption, and their identities were hidden. An estimated 400 children were stolen during this period, often from mothers who gave birth in prison and who were later "disappeared." By June 2019, 130 of these adoptees had their identities restored.

On 17 May 2013, Videla was reported as having died of natural causes in his sleep while serving his sentence at a Marcos Paz prison. An autopsy revealed he died from multiple fractures and internal hemorrhaging caused by having slipped in a prison shower on 12 May. According to a 2009 ruling by the military, he (and others convicted of human rights violations) were not eligible for a military funeral. A private ceremony was held by his family.

Human rights organizations throughout the political compass denounced Videla, saying that he died without admitting that he was aware of the disappeared persons and kidnapped children. None of the tried ex-officers has provided details about the fate of those missing. Videla appeared mostly unrepentant for the actions against those whom he deemed terrorist subversives.

Several Argentine politicians commented on his death. Deputy Ricardo Gil Lavedra of the Radical Civic Union said that Videla will be remembered as a dictator, while Hermes Binner expressed condolences to the victims of his government. Hernán Lombardi, Minister of Culture of Buenos Aires city, praised Argentine democracy for having tried and sentenced the dictator. Ricardo Alfonsín said it was good that Videla had died in prison. Adolfo Pérez Esquivel, Argentine recipient of the 1980 Nobel Peace Prize, said, "The death of Videla should not delight anybody, we have to keep working for a better society, more just, more humane, so that all that horror never happens again".

Cabinet Chief Juan Manuel Abal Medina said that he was glad that, "Videla died prosecuted, sentenced and imprisoned in a common cell, repudiated by the Argentine people". At the time of Videla's death he was one of two surviving dictators of Argentina. The last surviving president from the dictatorship, Reynaldo Bignone, died on 7 March 2018.

Videla remained a Roman Catholic till the end of his life.

See also

Albano Harguindeguy

References

External links

Jorge Rafaél Videla Biography: Dictator, Murderer, General (1925–2013) . Biography.com
Ex-Argentine Dictator Sentenced to Life in Prison – video report by Democracy Now!
"Former Dictator of Argentina Found Guilty Of Crimes Against Humanity" , Buenos Aires English, December 2010

|-

|-

|-

Presidents of Argentina
Operatives of the Dirty War
1925 births
2013 deaths
Argentine people convicted of crimes against humanity
Leaders who took power by coup
Operation Condor
Propaganda Due
People from Mercedes, Buenos Aires
Colegio Militar de la Nación alumni
Argentine anti-communists
Argentine generals
Argentine Roman Catholics
Heads of government who were later imprisoned
Prisoners sentenced to life imprisonment by Argentina
Prisoners who died in Argentine detention
People convicted of kidnapping
People of the Cold War
20th-century Argentine politicians
20th-century criminals
Argentine politicians convicted of crimes
Deaths from bleeding
Politicide perpetrators